Daniel Forsberg (born 1 January 1992) is a Finnish Muay Thai kickboxer. He is the current KOK Middleweight Champion.

In July and August 2021, Combat Press ranks him as the #10 middleweight in the world.

Martial arts career
Forsberg was scheduled to fight veteran Jiri Zak at Gibu Fight Night 2 on 5 December 2015. He won the fight by unanimous decision.

Forsberg was scheduled to face Lukáš Dvořák at Heroes Gate 16 on 13 March 2016. Dvořák won the bout by split decision.

Forsberg took part in a King of Kings Middleweight tournament, held at KOK 45 on October 26, 2018. Forsberg won the semifinal match against Karolis Liukatis by unanimous decision. Advancing to the tournament finals, he faced Ali Al Ameri. Al Ameri won the final by a second-round knockout, landing a well placed knee 25 seconds into the round.

Forsberg was scheduled to face Tomas Steponkevicius at KOK Hero’s Series in Vilnius on 16 March 2019. He won the fight by a third-round knockout.

Forsberg was scheduled to face Yuri Orlov at Mõisaküla Fight 3 on 3 August 2018. He won the fight by an extra round unanimous decision.

Forsberg was scheduled to fight Hendrik Themas at FIGHTLAND 2018 on 8 December 2018. He won the fight by majority decision.

Forsberg was scheduled to face Raimonds Aukstikalnis at KOK World GP in Riga 2018 on 26 October 2018. He won the fight by split decision.

Forsberg fought a rematch with Raimonds Aukstikalnis at KOK World GP in Helsinki 2019 on 17 May 2019, for the KOK Middleweight title. Forsberg was more convincing in their second meeting, winning the fight by unanimous decision.

Forsberg was scheduled to make his first title defense against Jurijs Orlovs at KOK 81: World Series on 26 October 2019. He successfully defended the title through a third-round technical knockout, due to a doctor stoppage. The bout ended because of a broken nose suffered by Orlovs from an accidental headbutt.

Forsberg challenged Chip Moraza-Pollard for the Lion Fight 160 lbs title at Lion Fight 61 on 11 January 2020. Moraza-Pollard won the fight by unanimous decision, with scores of 46-49, 46-49, 46-49.

Forsberg was scheduled to make his second title defense against Dawid Mirkowski at KOK 83 on 29 February 2020. He later withdrew from the bout due to illness.

Forsberg took part in the Leveli Fight Night openweight tournament on 29 May 2021, being scheduled to face Uku Jürjendal in the semifinals. Although he came into the bout as a favorite, Forsberg struggled to achieve any headway against a larger opponent. He lost the fight by unanimous decision.

Championships and accomplishments

Amateur
Suomen Muay Thai Liitto
 2011 National Muaythai Championships (-81 kg)
 2012 National Muaythai Championships (-86 kg)
 2013, 2014 & 2015 National Muaythai Championships (-81 kg)
 2018 National Muaythai Championships (+91 kg)
International Federation of Muaythai Associations
 2016 IFMA World Championship (-86 kg)

Professional
King of Kings
KOK Middleweight (-85 kg) Championship
One successful title defense

Fight record

|-  style="text-align:center; background:#fbb;"
| 2021-12-20 || Loss ||align=left| Aleksei Dimitriev || Leveli Fight Night 2: Christmas Mayhem || Espoo, Finland || Decision (Split) || 3 ||3:00 
|-

|-  style="text-align:center; background:#fbb;"
| 2021-05-29 || Loss ||align=left| Uku Jürjendal || Leveli Fight Night, Tournament Semifinal || Espoo, Finland || Decision (Unanimous) || 3 ||3:00 
|-
|-  style="text-align:center; background:#fbb;"
| 2020-01-11 || Loss ||align=left| Chip Moraza-Pollard || Lion Fight 61 || Las Vegas, Nevada, United States || Decision (Unanimous) || 5 ||3:00 
|-
! style=background:white colspan=9 |
|-  style="text-align:center; background:#cfc;"
| 2019-10-26 || Win ||align=left| Yuri Orlov || KOK 81: World Series || Riga, Latvia|| TKO (Doctor stoppage) || 3 ||3:00 
|-
! style=background:white colspan=9 |
|-  style="text-align:center; background:#cfc;"
| 2019-05-17|| Win ||align=left| Raimonds Aukstikalnis || KOK World GP in Helsinki 2019 || Helsinki, Finland|| Decision (Unanimous) || 5 ||3:00 
|-
! style=background:white colspan=9 |
|-  style="text-align:center; background:#cfc;"
| 2019-03-16 || Win ||align=left| Tomas Steponkevicius  || KOK Hero’s Series in Vilnius || Vilnius, Lithuania || KO || 3 ||
|-  style="text-align:center; background:#cfc;"
| 2018-12-08|| Win ||align=left| Hendrik Themas || FIGHTLAND 2018 || Keila, Estonia || Decision (Majority) || 3 ||3:00 
|-
|-  style="text-align:center; background:#cfc;"
| 2018-10-26 || Win ||align=left| Raimonds Aukstikalnis || KOK World GP in Riga 2018 || Riga, Latvia || Decision (Split) || 3 ||3:00 
|-
|-  style="text-align:center; background:#cfc;"
| 2018-08-03 || Win ||align=left| Yuri Orlov|| Mõisaküla Fight 3 || Mõisaküla, Estonia || Ext. R. Decision (Unanimous) || 3 ||3:00 
|-
|-  style="text-align:center; background:#cfc;"
| 2017-05-27 || Win ||align=left| Thomas Kamara || NFC 2 || Turku, Finland || Decision (Unanimous) || 3 ||3:00 
|-
|-  style="text-align:center; background:#fbb;"
| 2017-03-17 || Loss ||align=left| Ali El Ameri || KOK 45, Middleweight Tournament Final || Vilnius, Lithuania || KO (Knee) || 2 || 0:25 
|-
|-  style="text-align:center; background:#cfc;"
| 2017-03-17 || Win ||align=left| Karolis Liukatis || KOK 45, Middleweight Tournament Semifinal || Vilnius, Lithuania || Decision (Unanimous) || 3 ||3:00 
|-
|-  style="text-align:center; background:#fbb;"
| 2016-03-13 || Loss ||align=left| Lukáš Dvořák || Heroes Gate 16 || Prague, Czech Republic || Decision (Split) || 5 ||3:00 
|-
|-  style="text-align:center; background:#cfc;"
| 2016-02-20 || Win ||align=left| Kim Nielsen || Siam Warriors III || Copenhagen, Denmark|| KO (Body shot) || 1 || 
|-
|-  style="text-align:center; background:#cfc;"
| 2015-12-05 || Win ||align=left| Jiri Zak || Gibu Fight Night 2 || Prague, Czech Republic || Decision (Unanimous) || 5 ||3:00 
|-
|-  style="text-align:center; background:#cfc;"
| 2015-09-26 || Win ||align=left| Jafar Mukri || Promotion Showdown vol. 2 || Turku, Finland || KO (Left straight) || 2 || 
|-
|-  style="text-align:center; background:#cfc;"
| 2014-11-07 || Win ||align=left| Mantas Stankis || Best Fight || Klaipėda, Lithuania || Decision (Unanimous) || 3 || 3:00
|-

|- style="background:#fbb;"
| 2018-05-14 || Loss || align="left" | Ali Dogan || 2018 IFMA World Championship, Tournament Quarterfinal || Cancun, Mexico || Decision  || 3 || 2:00
|- style="background:#cfc;"
| 2018-05-12 || Win || align="left" | Victor Monfort Fernandez || 2018 IFMA World Championship, Tournament First Round || Cancun, Mexico || Decision  || 3 || 2:00
|- style="background:#cfc;"
| 2018-03-13 || Win || align="left" | Antti Ikonen|| Finnish Muay Thai Championship || Joensuu, Finland || Decision  || 3 || 2:00
|-
! style=background:white colspan=9 |
|- style="background:#cfc;"
| 2015-04-26 || Win || align="left" | Olli Leppänen || Finnish Kickboxing Championship || Finland || Decision  || 3 || 2:00
|-
|- style="background:#cfc;"
| 2015-02-15 || Win || align="left" | Jussi Pirttikangas || Finnish Muay Thai Championship || Cancun, Mexico || Decision  || 3 || 2:00
|-
! style=background:white colspan=9 |
|-
|- style="background:#cfc;"
| 2015-11-14 || Win || align="left" | Joakim Siljuberg || Nordic Muay Thai Championships ||  || Decision (Unanimous) || 3 || 3:00
|-
|- style="background:#cfc;"
| 2015-05-16 || Win || align="left" | Nadir Iskhakov || Fight Promotion Showdown || Helsinki, Finland || Decision (Split) || 3 || 3:00
|-
|- style="background:#cfc;"
| 2015-02-13 || Win || align="left" | Jussi Pirttikangas || Finnish Muay Thai Championship || Helsinki, Finland || Decision (Unanimous) || 3 || 3:00
|-
|- style="background:#fbb;"
| 2014-05-01 || Loss || align="left" | Aygun Mehmet || World Championship in Malaysia || Helsinki, Finland || Decision (Unanimous) || 3 || 3:00
|-
|- style="background:#cfc;"
| 2014-01-17 || Win || align="left" | Johan Vänttinen || Finnish Championship 2014 || Helsinki, Finland || WO ||  || 
|-
|- style="background:#cfc;"
| 2013-10-26 || Win || align="left" | Rickard Pettersson || Lucky Punch || Helsinki, Finland || TKO || 1 || 
|-
|- style="background:#cfc;"
| 2013-09-14 || Win || align="left" | Mikko Soikkeli || Turku Fight 5 || Helsinki, Finland || TKO || 4 || 
|-
|- style="background:#cfc;"
| 2013-07-28 || Win || align="left" | Bruno Sabtis ||  || Helsinki, Finland || Decision (Unanimous) || 3 || 2:00
|-
|- style="background:#cfc;"
| 2013-04-06 || Win || align="left" | Jani Toivonen || Fight For Glory || Helsinki, Finland || TKO || 5 || 
|-
|- style="background:#cfc;"
| 2013-03-16 || Win || align="left" | Panu Korpivaara || Finnish Championship Finals 2013 || Helsinki, Finland || Decision (Unanimous) || 3 || 2:00
|-
|- style="background:#cfc;"
| 2013-03-02 || Win || align="left" | Mikko Soikkeli ||  || Helsinki, Finland || Decision (Unanimous) || 3 || 2:00
|-
|- style="background:#cfc;"
| 2012-02-09 || Win || align="left" | Timo Suhonen ||  || Helsinki, Finland || Decision (Unanimous) || 3 || 2:00
|-
|- style="background:#fbb;"
| 2012-11-24 || Loss || align="left" | Yassin Bensenouci || Nordic Championship || Helsinki, Finland || Decision (Unanimous) || 4 || 2:00
|-
|- style="background:#cfc;"
| 2012-06-09 || Win || align="left" | Aldo Reinla ||  || Helsinki, Finland || TKO || 5 ||
|-
|- style="background:#cfc;"
| 2012-05-26 || Win || align="left" | Juha Vanhalakka ||  || Helsinki, Finland || TKO || 4 ||
|-
|- style="background:#cfc;"
| 2012-03-17 || Win || align="left" | Aldo Reinla || Combat Academy of Finland Fight Event || Helsinki, Finland || Decision (Unanimous) || 4 || 2:00
|-
|- style="background:#fbb;"
| 2011-09-24 || Loss || align="left" | Petter Wallin || Battle of Botnia 4 || Helsinki, Finland || Decision (Split) || 4 || 2:00
|-
|- style="background:#fbb;"
| 2011-07-30 || Loss || align="left" | Filipia Kulawinski ||  || Helsinki, Finland || Decision (Split) || 4 || 2:00
|-
|- style="background:#cfc;"
| 2011-04-17 || Win || align="left" | Jones Hassandor || 2011 Finnish Championships, Tournament Semifinals || Helsinki, Finland || Decision (Unanimous) || 3 || 2:00
|-
! style=background:white colspan=9 |
|-
|- style="background:#cfc;"
| 2011-04-16 || Win || align="left" | Artem Semen || 2011 Finnish Championships, Tournament Quarterfinals || Helsinki, Finland || Decision (Unanimous) || 3 || 2:00
|-
|- style="background:#cfc;"
| 2011-04-16 || Win || align="left" | Deni Denisenko || 2011 Finnish Championships, First Round || Helsinki, Finland || Decision (Unanimous) || 3 || 2:00
|-
|- style="background:#fbb;"
| 2011-04-09 || Loss || align="left" | Ville Aalto ||  || Helsinki, Finland || Decision (Unanimous) || 5 || 2:00
|-
|- style="background:#fbb;"
| 2011-01-29 || Loss || align="left" | Panu Korpivaara ||  || Helsinki, Finland || Decision (Split) || 5 || 2:00
|-
|- style="background:#cfc;"
| 2010-12-04 || Win || align="left" | Olli Leppänen ||  || Helsinki, Finland || Decision (Unanimous) || 5 || 2:00
|-
|- style="background:#cfc;"
| 2010-11-27 || Win || align="left" | Jarno Laitinen || Turku Fight || Helsinki, Finland || Decision (Unanimous) || 5 || 2:00
|-
|- style="background:#cfc;"
| 2010-10-23 || Win || align="left" | Panu Korpivaara ||  || Helsinki, Finland || Decision (Split) || 5 || 2:00
|-
|- style="background:#cfc;"
| 2010-04-17 || Win || align="left" | Jani Majander ||  || Helsinki, Finland || Decision (Unanimous) || 4 || 2:00
|-
|- style="background:#cfc;"
| 2010-04-03 || Win || align="left" | Janne Ollonen || Turku Fight Resurrection || Helsinki, Finland || Decision (Unanimous) || 5 || 2:00
|-
|- style="background:#fbb;"
| 2010-02-06 || Loss || align="left" | Jani Toivonen ||  || Helsinki, Finland || TKO || 2 || 
|-
|- style="background:#fbb;"
| 2009-12-12 || Loss || align="left" | Simo Ukkonen ||  || Helsinki, Finland || Decision (Split) || 5 || 2:00
|-
|- style="background:#cfc;"
| 2009-11-21 || Win || align="left" | Nikolaos Dimitriadis ||  || Helsinki, Finland || Decision (Unanimous) || 5 || 2:00
|-
|- style="background:#cfc;"
| 2009-10-24 || Win || align="left" | Jussi Pirttikangas || Finnish Youth Championship 2009 || Helsinki, Finland || Decision (Unanimous) || 5 || 2:00
|-
|- style="background:#cfc;"
| 2009-05-23 || Win || align="left" | Simo Ukkonen ||  || Helsinki, Finland || Decision (Unanimous) || 4 || 2:00
|-
|- style="background:#cfc;"
| 2009-03-28 || Win || align="left" | Tatu Verta || || Helsinki, Finland || Decision (Split) || 4 || 2:00
|-
|- style="background:#cfc;"
| 2009-01-31 || Win || align="left" | Jouni Ahonen ||  || Helsinki, Finland || Decision (Unanimous) || 3 || 2:00
|-
|- style="background:#fbb;"
| 2008-12-13 || Loss || align="left" | Janne Herpola || Helsinki Thaiboxing Club Fight Event || Helsinki, Finland || Decision (Unanimous) || 3 || 2:00
|-
|- style="background:#cfc;"
| 2008-11-08 || Win || align="left" | Pekka Österberg || Finnish Championship Qualifiers || Helsinki, Finland || Decision (Split) || 3 || 2:00
|-
|- style="background:#fbb;"
| 2008-05-24 || Loss || align="left" | Mikko Tirronen || || Helsinki, Finland || Decision (Split) || 3 || 2:00
|-
|- style="background:#fbb;"
| 2008-04-12 || Loss || align="left" | Oskar Gruner || Combat Academy of Finland Fight Event || Helsinki, Finland || Decision (Split) || 3 || 2:00
|-
|- style="background:#cfc;"
| 2008-02-16 || Win || align="left" | Johan Korlin || Finnish Championship Qualifiers || Helsinki, Finland || Decision (Unanimous) || 3 || 2:00
|-
| colspan=9 | Legend:

See also
 List of male kickboxers

References

1992 births
Living people
Finnish male kickboxers
Middleweight kickboxers
Sportspeople from Turku
King of Kings champions